In the run-up to the next Slovenian parliamentary election, various organisations carry out opinion polling to gauge voting intention in Slovenia. Results of such polls are displayed in this article.

The date range for these opinion polls are from the previous parliamentary election, held on 24 April 2022, to the present day. The next parliamentary election is scheduled to be held no later than four years since the previous one.

Pollsters 
There are three opinion research companies that conduct electoral opinion polling on a regular basis within Slovenia:

 Mediana, separately conducting electoral public opinion polls for the Slovene daily newspaper Delo, and the Slovene television channel POP TV and its respective multimedia web portal 24ur.com;
 Ninamedia, jointly published by the Slovene daily newspapers Dnevnik and Večer;
 Parsifal SC, which conducts opinion polling for the conservative news media enterprise Nova24TV.

Graphical summary 
The following graph depicts the evolution of standings of the two main political parties and three other parties in the poll average since last parliamentary elections.

Poll results 

Poll results are listed in the table in reverse chronological order, showing the most recent first. The highest figure in each survey is displayed in bold, and the background shaded in the leading party's colour. In the case of a tie, no figure is shaded. When available, seat projections for 88 out of 90 seats (without seats reserved for minorities) are displayed below the percentages in a smaller font. 46 seats are required for an absolute majority in the National Assembly. The dates of when the poll was conducted are given when available, otherwise, the date of publication is listed.

References 

Slovenia
Opinion polling in Slovenia